Thirteenth grade, grade thirteen, or super senior year is the final year of secondary school in some jurisdictions. In some locales, receiving a high school diploma or equivalent is compulsory. In others, receiving a high school diploma is not required but may be a prerequisite to enrolling in certain post-secondary institutions. Students who complete Grade 13 usually graduate ages between 18 to 19.

Canada

The Ontario Academic Credit (OAC) ( or CPO) was the fifth year of secondary school education designed for students preparing for post-secondary education that existed in the province of Ontario, Canada. The OAC curriculum was codified by the Ontario Ministry of Education in Ontario Schools:  Intermediate and Senior (OS: IS) and its revisions. The Ontario education system had five years of secondary education, the fifth year known as "grade 13" from 1921 to 1988. Then, grade 13 was replaced in 1993 by the OAC for students starting high school (grade 9). The OAC continued to act as a fifth year of secondary education until it was phased out in 2003.

United States
Most jurisdictions in the United States require or offer only twelfth grade as the final year of secondary school. Some school districts in Oregon offer a thirteenth grade. In North Carolina, early college high schools may provide 5 years, providing a grade 13.

References

13
Secondary education